The  is a compact car produced by the Japanese manufacturer Nissan since 2004 through three generations. Depending on the market, the Tiida was also marketed as a subcompact car, particularly in the Americas for the first-generation model as the Nissan Versa. The first-generation model (C11) was produced up to 2018 in some markets, and was offered as a four-door sedan and a five-door hatchback.

The second-generation of Tiida (C12) is marketed since 2011 and only available as a five-door hatchback, while the role of a four-door sedan was passed to the subcompact Almera/Latio/Sunny/Versa (N17) and the compact Sylphy/Sentra/Pulsar (B17). Starting in 2013, the C12 Tiida was released in Thailand, Australia and New Zealand as the Nissan Pulsar. The C12 Tiida represents a departure from the C11, increasing its width to comfortably occupy the compact class, and was no longer marketed in Japan. It is currently produced and marketed in Taiwan.

The third-generation Tiida sold in Russia and China was introduced in 2015 as a rebadged Pulsar (C13) hatchback.



Etymology
The name "Tiida" is Okinawan for "sun", continuing the naming tradition started in 1966 with the Nissan Sunny.

First generation (C11; 2004) 

Nissan revealed the C-Note concept car in 2003 to preview the styling of the C11 Tiida. It is a concept hatchback based on the same platform of the Renault Mégane. The vehicle was unveiled at the 2003 Tokyo Motor Show.

The Tiida hatchback and the Tiida Latio sedan debuted in Japan in 2004, and in some European countries in 2007. It is based on a stretched-wheelbase variant of the Nissan B platform, and was manufactured as a five-door hatchback and a four-door sedan. It was sold in North America as Nissan Versa, and in Southeast Asia as the Nissan Latio. The C11 sat between the subcompact and compact car classes, acting as an intermediate model between the smaller Micra/March and larger Sylphy and Sentra models within the global Nissan portfolio.

In Japan, the Tiida replaced the Nissan Sunny (B15) in Nissan's lineup as the smallest sedan. In North America, it became a new entry-level model below the Sentra; and elsewhere the Tiida tended to occupy the role performed previously by the Nissan Almera/Pulsar/Sentra/Sunny (N16), sold in Japan as the Bluebird Sylphy (G10). The G10/N16's successor, the Bluebird Sylphy G11 was not widely sold outside Japan.

Engines include a 1.5-liter or 1.8-liter four-cylinder engine, the larger of which can be coupled to a six-speed manual transmission. There are also two optional dealer packages: the Nismo S-tune Aero Package and Nismo Performance Package.

Facelift 
In January 2008, Nissan introduced facelifted versions of both the hatchback and the sedan. They were enhanced with some key changes including new exterior features and interior designs, retuned power steering, powertrain enhancements and a new Plus navi HDD package called CarWings in Japan.

The exterior features a new grille, front bumper, headlights, tail lights, rear bumper and new wheel covers. The interior sports a more modern look as well as better visibility and usability, new instrument cluster design and metallic-finish dash panels.

The C11 started to be phased out in China first, during 2011 when partially replaced by the larger, compact class C12 Tiida/Pulsar hatchback. In 2012, the C11 began to be withdrawn from more markets as its main production bases ceased manufacture. The C11 was also replaced by the subcompact Nissan Note or Versa Note (E12) hatchback, and on the sedan fronts, by the subcompact Almera/Latio/Sunny/Versa (N17) and the compact Nissan Pulsar/Sentra/Sylphy (B17).

Safety 
The Tiida Hatch in its most basic Latin American version with one airbag received 3 stars for adult occupants and 1 star for toddlers from Latin NCAP in May 2011.

The Tiida Hatch with two airbags received 4 stars for adult occupants and 1 star for toddlers from Latin NCAP in November 2011.

The Tiida Sedan in its most basic Latin American version with no airbags and no ABS received 0 stars for adult occupants and 2 stars for toddlers from Latin NCAP in April 2015.

The Tiida Sedan with two airbags and no ABS received 4 stars for adult occupants and 2 stars for toddlers from Latin NCAP in September 2015.

Marketing 
Asia
In mainland China, the Tiida is produced by the Dongfeng Motor Company, a joint venture between Nissan and a local company.

In Malaysia, the first generation Tiida was sold as the Latio and available with in both sedan and hatchback body styles. The sedan was simply known as Latio while the hatchback was known as the Latio Sport. Unveiled in May 2007 and available in June 2007, four variants were initially offered for the sedan body style: 1.6 ST (M), 1.6 ST (A), 1.6 ST-L (A), 1.8 Ti (A). The hatchback was available in a sole 1.6 ST-L (A) variant. In April 2008, a limited 'Tuned By Impul' edition was available for both variants. The 'Tuned By Impul' edition featured a body kit, sports suspension, different exhaust system and different alloy wheels. In September 2011, the facelift version of Latio reduced the variant count to just two. A sole 1.6 variant for the sedan and a sole 1.8 variant for the hatchback.

In Singapore, the Tiida and Tiida Latio were initially sold alongside the older and cheaper Sunny N16 and the bigger and more expensive Sylphy.

In Indonesia, the Tiida 1.8 hatchback was marketed for private use, while the 1.6 sedan was for taxi fleet only.

In Hong Kong, the Tiida was used as a police car by the Hong Kong police. Some were police patrol cars whereas some were airport police cars.

In Taiwan, both Tiida hatchback and Tiida sedan are produced by Yulon. The Tiida sedan was still in production until May 2018.

North America

The Versa was introduced in the United States and Canada in July 2006 as a 2007 model. North and Latin American models of the Tiida use a DOHC 1.8-liter gasoline engine and are assembled at Nissan's Aguascalientes, Mexico assembly plant. It is also the only Nissan four-door passenger car in the United States and Canada to be sold worldwide, since the Sentra, Altima and Maxima are exclusive to North America.

According to a Nissan press release in 2008, "versa" is short for "versatile space" meant to imply the spaciousness of the interior and configurable cargo arrangements.

The North American Versa debuted at the 2006 North American International Auto Show in January of the same year. The hatchback model was introduced first, with the sedan arriving later at the end of the year, both as 2007 models. A 1.6-liter sedan replaced the 1.8-liter sedan in Canada for the 2009 model year, that year in the United States the 1.6 sedan was added to the lineup along the 1.8 sedan.

The Versa is powered by a 1.8 L I4 MR series engine producing 122 hp (91 kW) and 127 ft·lbf (170 N·m). Three transmissions are offered: a four-speed automatic, a continuously variable transmission (CVT), and a six-speed manual. Two trim levels include the S and SL—the SL offering air conditioning, power accessories and ABS, all of which are options on the S. The Versa SL also has features/options not available on the S such as cruise control (available on some S models), alloy wheels, optional CVT (the four-speed automatic is only available for the Versa S but CVT is available on some S models), optional Bluetooth connectivity for electronic devices, and a sport package which adds a power moonroof, rear spoiler, and underside aero kit.

The base transmission is a five-speed manual; a four-speed automatic is optional.

The Versa 1.6 features black trim (instead of body-colored) for the exterior mirror housings, license plate trim, and front grille; 14-inch steel wheels; black interior; four radio speakers with pre-wiring for a radio—but no radio itself. Safety features include six airbags, active front head restraints, and a tire pressure monitoring system. Air conditioning, AM/FM/CD audio system, power windows, power door locks, power mirrors, and keyless entry are offered as part of a value package. Anti-lock brakes with electronic brake force distribution (EBD) and brake assist are optional ($250) on top of the value package.

When it was introduced in fall 2008, the Versa's base price of US$9,990 made it the least expensive new car available in the United States, but a price cut to the Hyundai Accent usurped that distinction by $20. The Versa 1.6's $12,498 Canadian base price also undercut its competitors at launch.

2010 models featured a redesigned grille and a new design for the 1.8S model's wheel covers. In North America, the sedan was replaced by its second generation starting the 2012 model year (hence, 2011 being its last). The fate of the hatchback was however extended for one more year, 2012 being its last. Production of both for that market stopped in mid-2011.

The Tiida sedan was discontinued in Mexico, and was replaced by the new Versa in October 2019.

Latin America
On 11 January 2008, Chrysler LLC and Nissan Motor Co., Ltd. announced an agreement for Nissan to supply Chrysler with a new car based on Nissan Versa sedan for limited distribution in Latin America in 2009. However the plan failed to materialise, as it coincided with the arrival of Fiat in Chrysler capital in early 2009.

Electric prototype 

The prototype vehicle was unveiled at Nissan's Yokohama headquarters on 8 February 2009. Production version was set to begin sale in US and Japan in 2010.

Second generation (C12; 2011) 

The second generation, C12 series of the Nissan Tiida was unveiled in April 2011 at the Shanghai Auto Show. Sales in China commenced in June 2011. It is available only as a five-door hatchback, and is notably not sold in Japan. The C11 Tiida sedan was instead replaced by the Nissan Almera/Latio/Sunny/Versa (N17) and Nissan Pulsar/Sentra/Sylphy (B17). The C12 Tiida is in fact heavily related to the Sylphy B17—both base their construction on the Nissan V platform and share substantial mechanicals. The Thai manufactured versions even share the Sylphy B17's interior, while the original Chinese and Taiwanese models feature a distinctive design. Powertrains also remain common between C12 and B17 models.

Instead of being sized and marketed as both a subcompact or a compact car depending on the country, the second-generation Tiida was marketed as a C-segment worldwide as the March/Micra hatchback and the N17 series sedan took the role to serve the B-segment market.

Marketing 
Asia
In Thailand, the Tiida hatchback is called the Nissan Pulsar, which went on sale by February 2013. The Tiida hatchback comes with MRA8DE 1.8-litre engine, which it shares with the Nissan Sylphy. In Taiwan, the Tiida hatchback is known as the "Big Tiida" in advertisement due to the size upgrade and went on sale in January 2013.

Australia
In Australia, the Tiida name was dropped in favour of a return to using Nissan Pulsar, which was a very popular nameplate up to 2005.

The SSS high performance version with a 1.6-litre turbocharged engine arrived in late 2013. It was aimed at the "warm" hatch market which is a category placed between standard and hot hatches. It featured a 140 kilowatt turbocharged MR16DDT engine found in the Nissan Pulsar ST-S variant. It is also found in the Nissan Juke ST-S and TI-S. The engine was connected to either a close ratio 6-speed manual transmission or Continuously Variable Transmission (CVT). Premium features included push start ignition, keyless entry, dusk sensing headlights, dual climate control and satellite navigation.

Middle East
In the Middle East, the Tiida was available with a 1.6 or 1.8-litre engine.

Facelift (Taiwan) 
Instead of updating to the C13 Tiida/Pulsar, the C12 Tiida was facelifted exclusively in the Taiwanese market conducted by Yulon Motors. The facelift was a budget update to keep the appearance of the C12 Tiida in Taiwan in line with the C13 Tiida in other markets. The facelift replaces the front and rear light units with redesigned set up and light strips, front and rear bumpers, and the front grille. The new front grille features the updated Nissan V motion styling and the rear bumper was designed to mimic those on the C13 Tiida.

Tiida J 
The Taiwanese market Tiida received another facelift for the 2021 model year called the Tiida J. The Tiida J features redesigned front and rear bumpers.

Third generation (C13; 2015) 

Since March 2015, the Nissan Pulsar (C13), as sold in most of Europe, is sold in Russia and China under the Tiida nameplate.

Sales

References

External links 

Tiida
Cars introduced in 2004
2010s cars
2020s cars
Compact cars
Hatchbacks
Sedans
Front-wheel-drive vehicles
All-wheel-drive vehicles
Latin NCAP small family cars
Vehicles with CVT transmission